The 2012 World Single Distance Speed Skating Championships took place between 22 and 25 March 2012 in the Thialf, Heerenveen, Netherlands.

Queen Beatrix of the Netherlands visited the Championships on 24 March.

Schedule

Source: schaatsen.nl& ISU.org

Medal summary

Men's events

Source: ISU

Women's events

Source: ISU

Medal table

References

 
2012 Single Distance
World Single Distance Championships
World Single Distance, 2012
World Single Distance Speed Skating Championships, 2012
World Single Distance Speed Skating Championships